Comadia henrici is a moth in the family Cossidae. It is found in North America, where it has been recorded from California, Arizona, New Mexico, Colorado, Nevada and Utah.

The wingspan is 12–15 mm for males and 16–20 mm for females. The costa of the forewings has buff scales, which are either scattered or clustered in spots. The hindwings are white cream. Adults have been recorded on wing from March to July.

References

Natural History Museum Lepidoptera generic names catalog

Cossinae
Moths described in 1882
Moths of North America